Katarina (Kat) Cicak is a physicist. She is a researcher in the advanced microwave photonics group at the National Institute of Standards and Technology.

Early life and education 
Cicak was born in 1974 in Derventa in former Yugoslavia. In 1992 during the war in Yugoslavia, she relocated to Croatia then to the United States as a refugee.

Cicak received an A. S. in Mathematics-Science in 1995 from College of the Sequoias and a B.S. from the University of Southern California in 1997. She performed graduate research at Cornell supervised by Robert E. Thorne. Despite finishing her project in 2004, she only formally defended her dissertation in 2007 and finally submitted it in 2020. It is entitled Low-temperature Collective Transport and Dynamics in Charge Density Wave Conductor Niobium Triselenide.

Career 
During her undergraduate studies, Cicak completed internships at the Goddard Space Flight Center. In 2004, she began working at NIST in Boulder, Colorado.

At NIST, Cicak is a member of the Advanced Microwave Photonics research project. This work is part of NIST's Quantum Information Program, and combines advances in components for quantum computation based on superconductive circuits, mechanical components and optical interactions. Cicak has contributed to a mechanical "micro-drum" resonator that can couple to microwave radiation in operation at 40 milliKelvin in a superconducting cavity. The team took the strong coupling a step further using sideband cooling to lower the temperature to below 400 microKelvin toward a quantum ground state.

She has a patent for a "Reticulated Resonator".

Personal life 
Cicak is married to Kevin D. Moll, a researcher who she met at Cornell.

References

External links 
 

Living people
Place of birth missing (living people)
National Institute of Standards and Technology people
Women physicists
21st-century American physicists
21st-century American women scientists
Nationality missing
1974 births
Yugoslav emigrants to the United States